Léopold Gelot (8 March 1890 – 15 December 1980) was a French racing cyclist. He rode in the 1924 Tour de France.

References

1890 births
1980 deaths
French male cyclists